Eupterotidae is a family of insects in the order Lepidoptera with more than 300 described species.

Diversity
The family consists of four subfamilies and the unplaced Ganissa group. The subfamily Eupterotinae consists of about 11 genera, the Ganissa group about 10 genera, the subfamily Janinae about 16 genera, the subfamily Panacelinae consists of one genus and 3 species and the subfamily Striphnopteryginae of 15 genera.

Genera
Subfamily Eupterotinae
Tribe Cotanini Forbes, 1955
Cotana
Melanergon
Tribe Eupterotini
Apha
Apona
Cyrtojana
Dreata
Eupterote
Ganisa
Janomima
Lasiomorpha
Lichenopteryx
Marmaroplegma
Melanothrix
Neopreptos
Nisaga
Palirisa
Pandala
Parajana
Phyllalia
Poloma
Preptos
Preptothauma
Pseudoganisa
Pseudojana
Teratojana
Trichophiala
Unplaced to tribe
Bantuana
Paraphyllalia
Phiala
Schistissa
Subfamily Hibrildinae Berger, 1958
Hibrildes
Subfamily Janinae Aurivillius, 1892
Acrojana
Camerunia
Catajana
Drepanojana
Epijana
Gonojana
Gracilanja
Hemijana
Hoplojana
Jana
Malagasanja
Pterocerota
Rhodopteriana
Stenoglene
Striginiana
Tantaliana
Urojana
Subfamily Panacelinae Forbes, 1955
Panacela
Subfamily Striphnopteryginae Wallengren, 1858
Ebbepterote Oberprieler, Nässig & E.D. Edwards, 2003
Striphnopteryx
Subfamily Tissanginae Forbes, 1955
Tissanga
Unassigned
Calapterote
Papuapterote
Paramarane
Rarisquamosa

Former genera
Euchera
Gastridiota
Hypercydas
Leptojana
Messata
Murlida
Nervicompressa
Pachyjana
Paracydas
Pugniphalera (=Neodrymonia Matsumura, 1920)
Sangatissa
Sarmalia
Sarvena
Spalyria
Sesquiluna
Sphingognatha
Tagora
Thermojana Yang, 1995 (=Gangaridopsis Grunberg, 1912)
Vianga (=Viana)

References

 , 2012: Description de nouveaux Eupterotidae africains  (Lepidoptera). Entomologia Africana 17 (2): 2-14.
 , 1955: The subdivision of the Eupterotidae (Lepidoptera). Tijdschrift voor Entomologie 98 (2): 85-132.
 , 2008: An annotated catalogue of the genera of Eupterotidae (Insecta, Lepidoptera, Bombycoidea). Senckenbergiana Biologica 88 (1): 53-80.
 , 2007: A second species with diurnal males of the genus Eupterote from Indonesia: Eupterote (Eupterote) splendens sp. n. from Sulawesi (Insecta, Lepidoptera, Bombycoidea, Eupterotidae). Senckenbergiana Biologica 87 (2): 189-194.
 . Butterflies and Moths of the World: Generic Names and their Type-species. Natural History Museum.
 ; ;  2003: Ebbepterote, a new genus for the Australian 'Eupterote' expansa (T. P. Lucas), with a revised classification of the family Eupterotidae (Lepidoptera). Invertebrate systematics, 17: 99-110.

External links
Natural History Museum Lepidoptera genus database

 
Moth families